Alexandre Istrati (9 March 1915 in Dorohoi, Romania – 28 October 1991 in Paris, France) was a Franco-Romanian painter. He won numerous prizes, including 1953 the Prix Kandinsky.

He married fellow Romanian abstract expressionist painter, Natalia Dumitresco.

See also
Natalia Dumitresco

References
Read, Herbert, A Concise History of Modern Painting, 1958.

External links
ArtNet

1915 births
1991 deaths
French people of Romanian descent
Romanian painters
Abstract expressionist artists
20th-century French painters
20th-century French male artists
French male painters